Daphne Hernández (born 26 April 1976) is a Costa Rican diver. She competed in two events at the 1996 Summer Olympics.

References

External links
 

1976 births
Living people
Costa Rican female divers
Olympic divers of Costa Rica
Divers at the 1996 Summer Olympics
Sportspeople from Harris County, Texas
20th-century Costa Rican women
21st-century Costa Rican women